Pomaderris rugosa, wrinkle-leaved kūmaraho, or wrinkle-leaf pomaderris, is endemic to lowlands of the upper North Island of New Zealand. Fruit is dry and small and present from November to May. P. rugosa is frost resistant.

It is classed as Naturally Uncommon, but is widespread, often in pine forests, and grows mostly in Coromandel and west coast of Firth of Thames, but is also present on the nearby islands of Rotoroa, Ponui, Mayor / Tūhua and around Aotea and Kāwhia Harbours. Further north, at Herekino and along the Weiti River it also grows, possibly having been introduced. It prefers poor soils, rock (especially Rhyolite) and estuaries.

References 

Endemic flora of New Zealand
rugosa
Taxa named by Thomas Frederic Cheeseman